This is an incomplete list of Filipino full-length films, both mainstream and independently produced, released in theaters and cinemas in 2023. Some films are in production but do not have definite release dates.

January–March

April–June

 

Color key

References

External links
 

Philippines